La Capelle-lès-Boulogne (literally La Capelle near Boulogne) is a commune in the Pas-de-Calais department in the Hauts-de-France region of France.

Geography

Main sights
 The church of St.Jean-Baptiste, dating from the 19th century.
 The 18th-century chateau de Conteval.

See also
Communes of the Pas-de-Calais department

References

Capellelesboulogne